In enzymology, an O-fucosylpeptide 3-beta-N-acetylglucosaminyltransferase is an enzyme that catalyzes the chemical reaction in which a beta-D-GlcNAc residue is transferred from UDP-D-GlcNAc to the fucose residue of a fucosylated protein.

This enzyme belongs to the family of glycosyltransferases, specifically the hexosyltransferases.  The systematic name of this enzyme class is UDP-D-GlcNAc:O-L-fucosylpeptide 3-beta-N-acetyl-D-glucosaminyltransferase. This enzyme is also called O-fucosylpeptide beta-1,3-N-acetylglucosaminyltransferase.  This enzyme participates in notch signaling pathway.

Structural studies

References

 

EC 2.4.1
Enzymes of known structure